Mataguzi may refer to:

Mataguzi (tribe), an Albanian tribe of the Middle Ages
Mataguži, a village located in the area of settlement of the tribe